James Cavallo (March 14, 1927 – December 2, 2019) was an American musician best known for performing with his band in the 1956 movie, Rock, Rock, Rock, by pioneering music DJ Alan Freed. Jimmy and the Houserockers were the first white band to play at the Apollo Theater in Harlem, where they celebrated the movie's release.

Starting out in Syracuse
When Cavallo (often misspelled Cavello) was in high school in Syracuse in the early 1940s, he played in a swing band, playing harmony on alto sax.  He knew even then that playing the harmony was not for him, and he wanted to do the melody line, sing and lead a band. Cavallo started buying Louis Jordan records and learning those songs, and other jump blues records, and soon switched to tenor sax because that was the lead horn in jump blues.  When Cavallo was around 16, he formed his own band, but the only work they got was playing local Italian weddings (and the occasional Polish, Jewish, or Irish wedding).

The Navy and North Carolina
When he left home to serve in the United States Navy at the end of World War II, Cavallo took his saxophone with him. While in the service in North Carolina, and Washington DC, he spent his free time in black clubs, listening to the latest in the blues, and jamming with some of the rising stars of what would soon be called rhythm and blues, and later, rock and roll.

Upon his discharge, Cavallo hit the Carolina beaches with a band called the Jimmy Cavallo Quartet, one of the world's first white R&B bands, playing Wynonie Harris, Louis Jordan, and Hucklebuck Williams tunes, as well as originals. The line-up was Bobby Wrenn, drums; Max Alexander, bass; Bobby Hass, sax, and Diz Utley, sax. They played in the beach music or "shag" scene all over North Carolina through 1947–48, and during 1949 had a residency in Carolina Beach at a dance club called Bop City, drawing huge crowds of dancers.

Alan Freed and Rock, Rock, Rock
In August 1956, they played the Brooklyn Paramount with Fats Domino and Big Joe Turner, after which they appeared with Freed in the Vanguard movie Rock, Rock, Rock, in which they played the title song, and another tune called "The Big Beat," (that's Joe Marillo in the movie on second sax). The movie was released December 5, 1956, and the House Rockers played Harlem's Apollo Theater at the same time to promote the movie's release. In the 10-day extended gig, the House Rockers were augmented by a big band of veterans of the Duke Ellington and Count Basie orchestras, led by Sam The Man Taylor. Playing the Apollo in December 1956 put the House Rockers in the books as being the first white rock 'n' roll act to play the celebrated Apollo Theater (Buddy Holly would play there in 1957).  In 1957, they did a summer-long residence in Wildwood, New Jersey at a club called Harry Roeshe's Beachcomber, and the headliners of this bill were the Treniers. After that, Freed put them in another movie, Go, Johnny, Go, in 1959.  After cutting 12 tracks for Coral, they waxed for the Sunnyside and Hand labels in 1959, the Darcy label in 1963, and the Romar label in 1965.

Continuing to perform and record
Jimmy still visited hometown Syracuse for a gig or two every summer, until recently.  His fans there never seemed to tire describing the old days in Sylvan Beach, and even 65+ years later, he could still pack a club in Syracuse with followers who went to his shows in the early 1950s, and who waited patiently every year for Jimmy's annual migration back home. Once a year, these people, in their 80s and 90s, danced like they were 25 years old again. Jimmy had a resident engagement at P.G. Doogie's in Deerfield Beach and Saba Asian Restaurant & Lounge in Boca Raton, until recently.

After years of playing R&B in America, Cavallo finally played his first gig in the United Kingdom on November 22, 2002, at the Rhythm Riot festival in Rye, England. Joe Marillo lives in San Diego and still plays actively. The dual-sax sound of Cavallo and Utley, heard on the beaches of North Carolina in 1947 and in the 1950s with Cavallo and Marillo, has echoed in Cavallo's work ever since.

Cavallo performed every Friday and Saturday night at Timpano Chophouse in Fort Lauderdale from 2006 to 2013. Cavallo no longer performs at Timpano, but was the regular headliner on Saturday and Monday evenings at Blue Jeans Blue in Fort Lauderdale as recently as March, 2019, age 92.

Jimmy has three CDs on PetCap called Jimmy Cavallo Live at The Persian Terrace, of big band music, Live At Freddy's, recorded in 2003, and Jimmy Cavallo and the Houserockers, Then and Now, released in 2006. They can be bought directly from Petcap Music. There also is a CD of new recordings cut in 2002, called The Houserocker released on Blue Wave Records, which can be purchased directly from them. Also available from Blue Wave is a compilation CD that has every record Jimmy made from 1951 to 1973, even the rare BSD records, a total of 29 sides.

In 2016, Jimmy celebrated his 89th birthday, as usual, with a performance. He continued to play past age 90.

References

External links

Profile
NewTimesBPB.com article
LeonoreDecor.com article

1927 births
2019 deaths
American rhythm and blues musicians
American male saxophonists
American people of Italian descent
Musicians from Syracuse, New York
Military personnel from Syracuse, New York
United States Navy sailors
21st-century American saxophonists
21st-century American male musicians
20th-century American saxophonists